The Poisoned City: Flint's Water and the American Urban Tragedy is a 2018 book by journalist Anna Clark that examines the Flint water crisis. The book has five "positive" reviews, seven "rave" reviews, and one "mixed" review, according to review aggregator Book Marks.

References

2018 non-fiction books
English-language books
Metropolitan Books books
Flint, Michigan